Henry Symonds may refer to:

Henry Symonds (1859–1933), English barrister and numismatist
Henry Herbert Symonds (1885–1958), English Anglican priest, teacher and conservationist
Henry Alfred Symonds (born 1924), English member of the British Free Corps
Harry Symonds (Henry George Symonds, 1889–1945), Welsh cricketer

See also
Henry Simmons (disambiguation)